Dino: The Essential Dean Martin is a 2004 compilation album by Dean Martin, released on September 6, 2004. It contains thirty tracks, twenty from Capitol and ten from Reprise. It has since been reissued in two separate special editions, one in 2005 (augmented with a live disc) and one in 2011 (featuring six bonus tracks).

Alongside track listings and photographs, the liner notes include contributions from Stevie Van Zandt, Deana Martin and Gail Martin Downey. Van Zandt writes about the experience of watching Dean Martin's appearance as the host of the episode of The Hollywood Palace which featured the first US television appearance of The Rolling Stones. Deana Martin shares her memories of the recording session for "Memories Are Made of This" while Downey recalls Martin's explanation of how an empty bottle of Coca-Cola helped make "Houston" a hit.

The album was certified "Gold" in 2004 and "Platinum" in 2006.

Track listing
The included version of "You're Nobody till Somebody Loves You" is the 1960 Capitol album track rather than the charting 1964 Reprise version: William Ruhlmann of AllMusic suggests that the substitution was made in order to reduce the number of similar Reprise arrangements present.

2005 live disc
Recorded on July 27, 1962, at the Cal Neva Lodge & Casino. The full concert was released as the third disc of the 2012 box set Collected Cool.

2011 bonus tracks
The 2011 edition was split across two discs, both containing eighteen tracks. The first disc contains the first sixteen tracks of the standard edition with two additions.

The second disc includes the remaining fourteen tracks from the standard edition with four additions.

Charts

Weekly charts

Year-end charts

References

2004 compilation albums
Dean Martin albums
Capitol Records compilation albums